Jorge Daniel Hernández Govea (born 10 June 1989), also known as El Burrito, is a Mexican professional footballer who plays as a defensive midfielder for Liga MX club Querétaro.

Club career

Jaguares
Hernández made his professional debut on October 4, 2008, coming from the youth ranks of Chiapas. In 2010 Hernández scored a long range shot banger against Chivas de Guadalajara to open the score 1–0 in there eventual 4–0 victory.

Pachuca
On June 25, 2012, Hernández was presented as a C.F. Pachuca player after being transferred from Chiapas. Hernández won with C.F. Pachuca the Clausura 2016 tournament after winning on aggregated score 2–1.

Career statistics

International

Honours
Pachuca
Liga MX: Clausura 2016
CONCACAF Champions League: 2016–17

Mexico U23
Toulon Tournament: 2012

References

1989 births
Living people
Mexican footballers
Association football midfielders
Liga MX players
People from San Luis Potosí
Chiapas F.C. footballers
C.F. Pachuca players
Mexico international footballers
2017 CONCACAF Gold Cup players